The 4706th Air Defense Wing is a discontinued United States Air Force (USAF) organization. Its last assignment was with the 37th Air Division of Air Defense Command (ADC) at O'Hare International Airport (IAP), Illinois where it was discontinued in 1956.  It was established in 1952 at O'Hare as the 4706th Defense Wing in a general reorganization of Air Defense Command (ADC), which replaced wings responsible for a base with wings responsible for a geographical area.  It assumed control of several Fighter Interceptor squadrons that had been assigned to the 142d Fighter-Interceptor Wing, an Air National Guard wing mobilized for the Korean War and the 56th Fighter-Interceptor Group.  In early 1953 it also was assigned six radar squadrons in the Midwest and its dispersed fighter squadrons combined with colocated air base squadrons into air defense groups. The wing was redesignated as an air defense wing in 1954.  It was discontinued in 1956 and most of its units transferred to the 58th Air Division.

History
The 4706th Defense Wing was organized at the beginning of 1952 at O'Hare IAP in a major reorganization of ADC responding to ADC's difficulty under the existing wing base organizational structure in deploying fighter squadrons to best advantage. The wing assumed the operational squadrons and air defense mission of the inactivating 142d Fighter-Interceptor Wing (FIW), an Oregon Air National Guard (ANG) wing, which had been federalized and moved to O'Hare in 1951 in the expansion of the USAF for the Korean War. The wing also received the regular USAF 62d Fighter-Interceptor Squadron (FIS). flying F-86 Sabre aircraft, at O'Hare from the inactivating 56th Fighter-Interceptor Group at Selfridge AFB, Michigan and the 97th FIS at Wright-Patterson AFB, Ohio, which had been attached to the 142nd FIW. The wing also assumed command of ANG units stationed elsewhere in this reorganization, the 113th FIS, flying F-51H Mustangs, at Scott AFB, Illinois, and the 166th FIS, at Lockbourne AFB, Ohio, flying F-84 Thunderjet aircraft. Thus, the wing's fighter squadrons defended Illinois, Indiana, southern Wisconsin, western Michigan and western Ohio. Air Base Squadrons were also activated and assigned to the wing to provide support for USAF units stationed at bases where ADC was the host command.

As ADC realigned during the year. the 113th FIS was reassigned directly to Central Air Defense Force. Then in July, the 63d FIS, another F-86 squadron at Oscoda AFB, Michigan transferred into the wing, and in August, the 166th FIS, moved to Youngstown Municipal Airport, Ohio and was reassigned to the 4708th Defense Wing.

In February 1953 another ADC reorganization activated Air Defense Groups at ADC bases with dispersed fighter squadrons. These groups assumed direct command of the fighter squadrons at their stations, in addition to support squadrons to assist in their role as USAF host organizations at the bases. The 501st Air Defense Group (Air Def Gp), activated at O'Hare IAP, the 520th Air Defense Group, at Truax Field and the 534th Air Defense Group at Kinross AFB (later Kincheloe AFB), Michigan. Although the 527th Air Defense Group, activated at Oscoda AFB, it was assigned to another wing. Another result of the February 1953 reorganization was that the wing assumed the aircraft detection, control and warning mission, with six squadrons in four states being assigned to the wing.

In 1955, ADC implemented Project Arrow, which was designed to bring back on the active list the fighter units that had compiled memorable records in the two world wars. As a result of Project Arrow, the 501st Air Def Gp was replaced by the 56th Fighter Group (Air Defense), the 520th Air Def Gp was replaced by the 327th Fighter Group (Air Defense), and the 534th Air Def Gp was replaced by the 507th Fighter Group (Air Defense). Because Project Arrow called for fighter squadrons to be assigned to their traditional group headquarters, the 97th FIS was moved to Delaware and its personnel and equipment reassigned to the 56th Fighter-Interceptor Squadron. In early October, the 319th Fighter-Interceptor Squadron, flying F-94 Starfire aircraft was assigned to the wing in anticipation of its return to the United States as the Korean war was ending.

The 56th FIS and 319th FIS and three of the radar squadrons transferred from the wing to the 58th Air Division in March 1956 The wing was discontinued a few months later and its units assigned to other ADC organizations.

Lineage
 Designated as the 4706th Defense Wing and organized on 1 February 1952
 Redesignated as 4706th Air Defense Wing on 1 September 1954
 Discontinued on 8 July 1956

Assignments
 Western Air Defense Force, 1 February 1952
 30th Air Division, 16 February 1953
 37th Air Division, 1 March 1956 – 8 July 1956

Stations
 O'Hare International Airport, Illinois, 1 February 1952 – 8 July 1956

Components

Groups

Air Defense Groups
 501st Air Defense Group, 16 February 1953 – 18 August 1955
 520th Air Defense Group
 Truax Field, Wisconsin, 16 February 1953 – 18 August 1955
 534th Air Defense Group
 Kinross AFB, Michigan, 16 February 1953 – 18 August 1955

Fighter Groups
 56th Fighter Group (Air Defense), 18 August 1955 – 8 July 1956
 327th Fighter Group (Air Defense)
 Truax Field, Wisconsin, 18 August 1955 – 8 July 1956
 507th Fighter Group (Air Defense)
 Kinchloe AFB, Michigan, 18 August 1955 – 8 July 1956

Squadrons

Fighter Squadrons
 56th Fighter-Interceptor Squadron
 Wright-Patterson AFB, Ohio, 18 August 1955 – 1 March 1956
 62 Fighter-Interceptor Squadron, 6 February 1952 – 16 February 1953
 63rd Fighter-Interceptor Squadron
 Oscoda AFB, Michigan, 1 July 1952 – 16 February 1953
 97th Fighter-Interceptor Squadron, 6 February 1952 – 18 August 1955
 Wright-Patterson AFB, Ohio
 113th Fighter-Interceptor Squadron (Federalized Indiana ANG)
 Scott AFB, Illinois, 6 February 1952 – 1 April 1952
 166th Fighter-Interceptor Squadron (Federalized Ohio ANG)
 Lockbourne AFB, Ohio, 1 April 1952 – 30 March 1953
 319th Fighter-Interceptor Squadron
 Johnson AB, Japan 1 October 1955 – 18 October 1955, Bunker Hill AFB, Indiana, 18 October 1955 – 1 March 1956

Radar Squadrons
 664th Aircraft Control and Warning Squadron
 Bellefontaine AFS, Ohio, 16 February 1953 – 1 March 1956
 665th Aircraft Control and Warning Squadron
 Keweenaw (later Calumet AFS), Michigan, 16 February 1953 – 8 July 1956
 676th Aircraft Control and Warning Squadron
 Antigo AFS, Wisconsin, 16 February 1953 – 8 July 1956
 781st Aircraft Control and Warning Squadron
 Fort Custer, Michigan, 16 February 1953 – 1 November 1953
 782d Aircraft Control and Warning Squadron
 Rockville AFS, Indiana, 16 February 1953 – 1 March 1956
 784th Aircraft Control and Warning Squadron
 Fort Knox, Kentucky, 16 February 1953 – 1 March 1956

Support Squadrons
 83rd Air Base Squadron, 1 February 1952 – 16 February 1953
 84th Air Base Squadron
 Oscoda AFB, Michigan, 1 February 1952 – 16 February 1953
 91st Air Base Squadron
 Kinross AFB, MI, 14 November 1952 – 16 February 1953

Aircraft

 North American F-51D Mustang, 1952
 F-51H, 1952

 North American F-86A Sabre, 1952–1953
 F-86D, 1953–1956
 F-86E, 1952–1953
 F-86F, 1952, 1955–1956

 Republic F-84C Thunderjet, 1952
 Northrop F-89D Scorpion, 1953–1956

 Lockheed F-94B Starfire, 1953
 F-94C, 1955–1956

Commanders
 Col. Fred T. Crimmins, Jr., 1 February 1952 – c. 8 July 1952
 Col. Benjamin S. Preston, Jr. 8 July 1952 – 27 July 1953
 Col. William D. Greenfield, 27 July 1953 – Unknown

See also
 List of MAJCOM wings
 List of United States Air Force Aerospace Defense Command Interceptor Squadrons
 List of United States Air Force aircraft control and warning squadrons

References

Notes

Bibliography

 Buss, Lydus H.(ed), Sturm, Thomas A., Volan, Denys, and McMullen, Richard F., History of Continental Air Defense Command and Air Defense Command July to December 1955, Directorate of Historical Services, Air Defense Command, Ent AFB, CO, (1956)
 
 
 Grant, C.L., The Development of Continental Air Defense to 1 September 1954, (1961), USAF Historical Study No. 126

Further reading
 
Vol II 
 
 
 

4706
Air defense wings of the United States Air Force
Aerospace Defense Command units
Military units and formations established in 1952
Military units and formations in Illinois